Walerand Teutonicus was a Lord Warden of the Cinque Ports during the thirteenth century.

A feature of British maritime history of this period was the appointment, generally by county, of one or more "keepers of the coast", which led in time to the consolidation of the powers of the Lord Warden of the Cinque Ports. The office was not continuous, and such men were more often called upon during a time of war, or when a threat was perceived in the Channel. Thus such records have survived for the reign of Edward III of England preceding the Battle of Sluys in 1340.

In addition to a military command both at sea and on land, judicial matters relating to the sea and coast came within the Keepers' remit. They were expected to crush piracy, repel raiders, protect coasters and fishermen, and summon the county to arms if there was a threat of invasion. Under the care of the keeper was the line of fire beacons, corresponding to the modern coastguard stations, usually placed on a hill near the shore and guarded in war time by a watch from the neighbouring parishes.

John Marshal was keeper of the ports of Somerset and Dorset in 1215, and in 1224 Ralph Germun was a keeper of the Dorset coast. In the year 1230 Geoffery de Lucy was Warden of Portsmouth, Hythe and Romney, Constable of Dover Castle. Henry de Sandwich was warden of Dover and Sandwich, whilst Shoreham, Winchelsea, Rye, Hastings, Seaford and Pevensea were under the administration of the Constable of Hastings.

In 1235 Hamo de Crevecur, who was appointed Lord Warden in 1263 shared joint control with Walerand Teutonicus, of the coast between Hastings and Poole, in Dorset.

References

13th-century English Navy personnel
Teutonicus, Walerand